Apodemia mormo langei, the Lange's metalmark butterfly, is an endangered North American butterfly. It is a subspecies of the Mormon metalmark and belongs to the family Riodinidae. The butterfly is endemic to California, where it is known from one strip of riverbank in the San Francisco Bay Area. A 2008 count estimated the total remaining population at 131 individuals. Since 2011, this number has dropped to about 25–30.

Description
Lange's metalmark is a fragile, brightly colored butterfly in the Riodinidae (metalmark) family. Dorsal wings are largely black with white spots. Red-orange coloration extends through the inner forward half of the forewing, the hindwing bases, and a small central patch subtended by black. Below, the wings have a more muted pattern of gray, white, black, and orange.

Status and distribution
The butterfly has been classified in the United States as a federal endangered species (Federal Register 41:22044; June 1, 1976).

Lange's metalmark butterfly was historically restricted to sand dunes along the southern bank of the Sacramento River, and is currently found only at Antioch Sand Dunes (a misnomer, as the sand was long ago removed and the landscape is now hilly scrub) in Contra Costa County, California. Most of the habitat is now part of the Antioch Dunes National Wildlife Refuge, administered by the Don Edwards San Francisco Bay National Wildlife Refuge Complex. Recent population counts have ranged from several hundred to more than a thousand individuals. While the Antioch Dunes Recovery Plan of April 25, 1984, has been put under action, no critical habitat has been designated as yet.

In the early 1900s, the isolated dune habitat in the Sacramento-San Joaquin River Delta began to experience a dramatic change as human development expanded. The easily accessible sand was harvested to make bricks. Large-scale sand mining and industrial development fragmented the sand dune habitat until only a small portion of the original ecosystem remained. Nonnative grasses and other vegetation encroached on the sand dunes to crowd the few remaining endangered plants. By the time the Antioch Dunes Refuge was established, only a few acres of remnant dune habitat supported the last natural populations of Antioch Dunes evening primrose (Oenothera deltoides ssp. howellii), Contra Costa wallflower (Erysimum capitatum var. angustatum) and Lange's metalmark.

A reservoir of moving sand is essential to maintain the dynamic ecology of the dunes, as moving sand opens areas for the establishment of seedling plants. Roto-tilling has contributed to the invasion of exotic vegetation that stabilizes the remaining sand-dune habitat and competes with native dune vegetation. Habitat improvement activities have included dune restoration, hand clearing of nonnative plant species, planting buckwheat seedlings and restriction of public access to avoid trampling and fire.

A nonprofit environmental group has been breeding the butterflies in captivity since 2007 and periodically releasing larvae and adults back to the wild as insurance against collapse of the remaining wild population.

Life history
All the life stages of Lange's metalmark butterflies are found close to the larval food plant, buckwheat (Eriogonum nudum ssp. psychicola). The eggs are deposited on buckwheat leaves near the leaf petiole during a short mating flight of 10 days' duration. Larvae hatch during the rainy months. Larvae are known to feed only on buckwheat. The adults may use buckwheat, butterweed (Senecio douglasii) for nectar. Lange's metalmark butterfly also uses silver lupine (Lupinus albifrons) for mating.

Unlike the many butterfly species that have several generations a year, Lange's metalmark has only one. The fecundity of wild individuals is low. Detailed life history and physiological requirements of this subspecies are unknown.

Notes

References

 Arnold, R. A. 1980. Ecological studies of 6 endangered butterflies: island biogeography, patch dynamics, and the design of nature preserves. PhD thesis. University of California, Berkeley. Berkeley, California.
 Howe, W. H. (ed.). 1975. The butterflies of North America. Doubleday and Co. Garden City, New York.
 Opler, P. A. and J. A. Powell. 1962. Taxonomic and distributional studies on the western components of the Apodemia mormo complex (Riodinidae).  Journal of The Lepidopterist's Society. 15:145–171.
 Thelander, C. ed. 1994. Life on the edge: a guide to California's endangered natural resources. BioSystem Books. Santa Cruz, California. p 432–433.
 U.C. Berkeley, Essig Museum of Entomology.  California's Endangered Insects.
 U.S. Fish & Wildlife Service. 1984. Antioch Dunes Recovery Plan. Portland, Oregon.
 Jon Mooallem. Wild Ones: A Sometimes Dismaying, Weirdly Reassuring Story About Looking at People Looking at Animals in America.  Penguin, 2014.
 U.S. Fish and Wildlife Service. 2019. Recovery Plan for Three Endangered Species Endemic to Antioch Dunes, California: Lange's metalmark butterfly (Apodemia mormo langei), Oenothera deltoides subsp. howellii (Antioch Dunes evening-primrose), and Erysimum capitatum var. angustatum (Contra Costa wallflower) Draft Amendment 1. Page 5. US Fish and Wildlife Service, Portland, Oregon.

mormo langei
Endemic fauna of California
Fauna of the San Francisco Bay Area
Endangered fauna of California
Natural history of Contra Costa County, California
Butterflies described in 1938
ESA endangered species
Species endangered by habitat fragmentation
Butterfly subspecies